The 2016–17 Scottish Championship (known as the Ladbrokes Championship for sponsorship reasons) is the 22nd season in the current format of 10 teams in the second tier of Scottish football. The fixtures were published on 17 June 2016.

Hibernian won the league title and promotion after a 3–0 win against Queen of the South on 15 April 2017.

Teams
The following teams have changed division since the 2015–16 season.

To Championship

Promoted from Scottish League One
 Dunfermline Athletic
 Ayr United

Relegated from Scottish Premiership
 Dundee United

From Championship

Relegated to Scottish League One
 Alloa Athletic
 Livingston

Promoted to Scottish Premiership
 Rangers

Stadia and locations

Personnel and kits

Managerial changes

League summary

League table

Positions by round

Results
Teams play each other four times, twice in the first half of the season (home and away) and twice in the second half of the season (home and away), making a total of 180 games, with each team playing 36.

First half of season

Second half of season

Season statistics

Scoring

Top scorers

3 league goals scored whilst on loan with St Mirren

Hat-tricks

Notes
4 Player scored 4 goals

Discipline

Player

Yellow cards

Red cards

Club

Yellow cards

Red cards

Attendances

Awards

Monthly awards

Annual awards

Championship Manager of the Season
The Championship Manager of the Season was awarded to Jim Duffy.

Championship Player of the Season
The Championship Player of the Season was awarded to John McGinn.

PFA Scotland Scottish Championship Team of the Year
The PFA Scotland Scottish Championship Team of the Year was:
Goalkeeper: Cammy Bell (Dundee United)
Defence: Nicky Devlin (Ayr United), Darren McGregor (Hibernian), Thomas O'Ware  (Greenock Morton), Lewis Stevenson (Hibernian)
Midfield: Stevie Mallan (St Mirren), John McGinn (Hibernian), Ross Forbes (Greenock Morton)
Attack: Tony Andreu (Dundee United),  Stephen Dobbie (Queen of the South), Jason Cummings (Hibernian)

Championship play-offs
Raith Rovers the second bottom team, entered into a 4-team playoff with the 2nd-4th placed teams in 2016–17 Scottish League One; Alloa Athletic, Airdrieonians and Brechin City.

Semi-finals

First leg

Second leg

Final
The winners of the semi-finals will compete against one another over two legs, with the winner competing in the 2017–18 Scottish Championship.

First leg

Second leg

References

Scottish Championship seasons
2016–17 Scottish Professional Football League
2
Scot